Gian Piero Ghio (born 28 January 1944 in Agna) is an Italian football coach and former player who played as a forward. He scored 69 goals from 282 appearances in the Italian professional leagues, which included 72 appearances in Serie A.

References

1944 births
Living people
Italian footballers
Association football forwards
Serie A players
U.C. Sampdoria players
Vis Pesaro dal 1898 players
A.C. Monza players
U.S. Avellino 1912 players
S.S. Lazio players
S.S.C. Napoli players
Inter Milan players
Atalanta B.C. players
Novara F.C. players
Casale F.B.C. players
Brescia Calcio players
Serie B players
Italian football managers
Ternana Calcio managers
U.S. Alessandria Calcio 1912 managers
Cosenza Calcio managers
U.S. Salernitana 1919 managers
Mantova 1911 managers
Spezia Calcio managers